The 1989 Mississippi State Bulldogs football team represented Mississippi State University during the 1989 NCAA Division I-A football season. The Bulldogs improved on the previous season's 1–10 record but were still unable to qualify for a bowl game.

Schedule

References

Mississippi State
Mississippi State Bulldogs football seasons
Mississippi State Bulldogs football